Fredy is a given name, and may refer to:
 Fredy Bareiro (born 1982), Paraguayan football player
 Fredy Montero Colombian footballer with Sounders FC
 Fredy Barth (born 1979), Swiss racing driver
 Fredy Glanzmann (born 1963), Swiss Nordic combined skier
 Fredy Hernández (born 1978), Colombian race walker
 Fredy Otárola, Peruvian politician
 Fredy Perlman (1934–1985), author, publisher and activist
 Fredy Reyna (1917–2001), Venezuelan musician, arranger and performer
 Fredy Schmidtke (born 1961), track cyclist
 Fredy Vanlalngila (born 1978), Musician, Farmer, Entrepreneur, Music Producer, Cyclist, Contractor, Car Wash Owner, Politician, Father of Four

See also
 Federico
 Fred (disambiguation)
 Freddie (disambiguation)
 Freddo
 Freddy (disambiguation)
 Frédéric
 Frederick (given name)
 Frederico
 Fredi
 Fredrik
 Fredro
 Friedrich (disambiguation)
 Fryderyk (disambiguation)